Bauer Hockey LLC (renamed Nike Bauer from 2005 to 2008) is a manufacturer of ice hockey equipment, fitness and recreational skates and apparel. Bauer produces helmets, gloves, sticks, skates, shin guards, pants, shoulder pads, elbow pads, hockey jocks and compression underwear, as well as goalie equipment. Some of its equipment, such as its ice hockey skates, are also approved for use in the sport of ringette.

Bauer developed and manufactured primarily ice hockey skates until 1990, when it acquired the hockey assets of Cooper Canada Ltd. In 2014, Bauer expanded into baseball and softball by purchasing Easton Diamond from Riddell (BRG Sports). Bauer operates as a unit of Peak Achievement Athletics Inc. in New Hampshire.

History 

In 1927, the Bauer family, owners of Western Shoe Company, established the Bauer Skate company as it is known today in Kitchener, Ontario.

Bauer was the first hockey company to begin producing hockey skates in which the blade was permanently secured to the boot. The boot and blade were made by Bauer. In years following, Bauer Skate's top line was originally marketed under the trade name "Bauer Supreme". The company was further popularized by the prominence of Bobby Bauer, a family member through marriage, as a Bauer married a Bauer, and Hockey Hall of Fame member who starred for the Boston Bruins in the 30s and 40s.

In the 1960s & 70's, the company paid superstar Bobby Hull to endorse their skates. As well superstars Bobby Clarke and Bernie Parent of the Flyers, Guy Lafleur of the Canadiens and Walter Tkaczuk and Brad Park of the Rangers were signed to endorsement contracts by Pro Department Manager Bill Vanderburg. These moves, and the introduction soon after of the TUUK chassis, ushered in a new era for the company.

Then in the early 1970s, Jim Roberts, also of the Canadiens, began wearing the TUUK blade. High-profile teammates Guy Lafleur, Steve Shutt and Jacques Lemaire soon followed. By 1995, the various Canstar skate brands (Micron, Bauer, etc.) had a 70% NHL market share while their TUUK and ICM holders combined for a 95% share. (Note: Bauer no longer offers the ICM holder on player skates, although it is still offered with goalie skates, in addition to the TUUK cowling.)

In 1994, Bauer began producing the perforated TUUK chassis, which is the piece of equipment that connects the steel blade to the actual boot of the skate. This allowed skates to be made lighter, as well as more durable.

In 1994, Canstar, the parent company of Bauer, became a wholly owned subsidiary of Nike. In 2006, beginning with the release of the Nike Bauer Supreme One90, the company's products were rebranded as Nike Bauer. This was the first time Nike had ever used a partner brand name on a product. Nike sold the company to investors Roustan, Inc. and Kohlberg & Co., on February 21, 2008, and the company was once again known as Bauer.

On September 25, 2008, Bauer announced the purchase of rival Mission-Itech. Mission and Itech gear was rebranded as Bauer beginning in 2009.

Timeline:
 1927 Roy Charles Bauer of Kitchener starts Western Shoe Company and the Bauer Canadian Skate company.
 1933 Company develops the first skate with the blade attached to boot.
 1965 Bauer becomes a division of shoe giant Greb Industries (known as the first international licensee of Hush Puppies shoes, also produced Kodiak boots and Collins safety shoes).
 1974 Warrington Products, controlled by Bronfman family, buys Greb.
 1975 Company launches the TUUK blade holder.
 1981 Ski and skate boot entrepreneur Icaro Olivieri merges his company with Warrington.
 1988 Olivieri and investment group executes leveraged buyout of struggling Warrington and renames it Canstar Sports, focussing on hockey equipment.
 1990 Canstar acquires the hockey assets of Cooper Canada.
 1992 Hockey star Eric Lindros joins Bauer team.
 1995 Nike buys Canstar, Bauer's parent company, for $395 million.
 1997 Bauer introduces the lightweight VAPOR skate and a better helmet with dual density foam.
 2005 Company develops the VAPOR XXX one piece stick.
 2008 Quebec-based Roustan Inc. and U.S.-based private equity firm Kohlberg & Co. purchase Nike's Bauer assets for $200 million.
 2008 Bauer buys Mission Tech.
 2010 Bauer buys Maverik Lacrosse.
 2011 Bauer Performance Sports (BPS) listed on the Toronto Stock Exchange [BAU], now PSG.
 2011 Alex Ovechkin signs Long-Term Global Partnership with Bauer Hockey
 2012 BPS acquires Cascade for lacrosse equipment and Inaria for sports apparel.
 2013 BPS acquires Combat Sports for composite baseball and softball bats.
 2014 BPS acquires Easton for baseball/softball equipment making them the world's largest team sports equipment suppliers.
 2014 Lists on New York Stock Exchange (PSG) with name change to Performance Sports Group.
 2016 PSG acquires Easton Hockey equipment business.
 2016 Bauer's parent company Performance Sports Group files for bankruptcy.
 2017 Bauer's new parent company is Peak Achievement Athletics Inc. (co-owned by affiliates of Sagard Holdings Inc. and Fairfax Financial Holdings Limited).
 2020 Easton Diamond Sports sold to Rawlings.

References

External links 

 

Sporting goods manufacturers of Canada
Ice hockey brands
Bandy brands
Nike, Inc.
Companies formerly listed on the Toronto Stock Exchange
1994 mergers and acquisitions
Exeter, New Hampshire
History of manufacturing in Ontario